Ganni is a Danish contemporary ready-to-wear fashion brand. Founded in 2000 by gallerist Frans Truelsen, it started gaining cult popularity as a designer label in the late 2010s under the tutelage of husband-and-wife duo Nicolaj Reffstrup and Ditte Reffstrup.

History 
Ganni was founded by Frans Truelsen as a line of cashmere apparel in 2000. In 2009, the Reffstrups took over the company with Ditte Reffstrup serving as creative director and Nicolaj Reffstrup as CEO. Ditte Reffstrup started her career as a clothes buyer for Danish and Parisian brands. Nicolaj Reffstrup, who graduated from Copenhagen Business School and earned his master's degree at IT University of Copenhagen, is a former technology entrepreneur. Private equity firm L Catterton acquired a 51% stake in the company in 2017.

Business model 
Ganni is described by fashion analysts as a luxury brand with lower-end prices, sitting between fast-fashion retailer Zara and high-fashion brand Dior, also known as a "sweet spot". Though it is considered a success for the brand, Nicolaj Reffstrup contends that not raising their prices causes major distribution issues because of its middling price range, having chosen to drop 100 accounts even if Ganni is the best-selling brand of the retailer. Ganni remains one of the top 20 best-selling brands on luxury e-tailer Net-a-Porter. By 2017, the brand's annual revenue was £35 million, and as of 2019 it was £75 million.

Products 
The company's main fashion house focuses on ready-to-wear T-shirt, pants, silhouettes, elasticized straps, waistbands, and ruching.

Campaign 
In 2019, the brand launched a Denmark-wide initiative called Ganni Repeat in which garments could be rented in Copenhagen for up to three weeks at a time. At Copenhagen Fashion Week in 2020, Ganni announced an expansion of Ganni Repeat to Europe and the United States in partnership with Levi's. Entitled "Love Letter," the rental-only joint collection consists of upcycled denim pieces. Ganni has collaborated widely with representatives from the creative industries to produce limited edition collections. Some examples include a range of jackets, a coat and a vest, with Icelandic 66 ° North, an outdoor clothing brand.  Footwear collection with Diemme, a shoe making brand. An upcycled collection designed with Ahluwalia, a menswear design.

Stores 
Ganni has multiple outlets spread in and around Copenhagen, Denmark.

Podcast 
Ganni initiated a Podcast where host Marjon Carlos speaks to different creative artists about their interests, life and activities.

Activism 
During the full-scale Russian invasion of Ukraine, which is part of Russian-Ukrainian war Ganni expressed support for Ukraine. During the Black Lives Matter movement, Ganni pledged 100,000 euros to be split between NAACP, and legal aid non-profit initiative ACLU.

Environmental 
In 2022, Ganni committed to working directly with suppliers to invest in ways to mitigate carbon emissions. By 2023 Ganni is committing to eliminate its use of virgin leather for its handbags, shoes and other leather pieces, shifting towards plant-based alternative for their collection it uses grape skin derived from winemaking as an alternative to leather. In 2022, Ganni entered into a partnership with Infinited Fiber Company, to transforms textile waste into high quality fiber. As a part of its sustainability drive, Ganni is re-introducing its past season prints and fabrics with modifications. In 2021, Ganni launched its plus size clothing lineup from european size 32 to 52 to enhance inclusivity. In Dec 2021, Ganni partnered with transparency tech provider to show its garments’ origins, in the context of Supply chain transparency. In 2021, Ganni partnered with on-demand repair service Sojo in order to provide aftercare to its customers in terms of repairing purchased clothes, to enhance reusability.

References

External links
 
 
 
 
 

Danish fashion
Danish companies established in 2000
Danish brands